Bhagavadajjukam (Sanskrit; translated as The Ascetic and the Courtesan or The Hermit and the Harlot) is a Sanskrit farce composed in the 7th century CE, usually attributed to Bodhayana. It is the earliest surviving example of a satirical play (or prahasana, one of the ten types of plays described in the treatise Natya Shastra) in Sanskrit literature. Featuring witty exchanges, an episode about the transmigration of souls and a discussion on Hindu dharma, the comical play was intended to mock the doctrines of Buddhism, whose rise at the time presented a challenge to the dominance of Hinduism in India.

Characters
Parivrajakamonk or master
Shandilyadisciple
Vasantsenacourtesan
Ramilakacourtesan's lover
Vidushakajester
A quack doctor
Yamaduta, messenger of the lord of death, Yamaraja

Synopsis
The play opens with a discussion on Hindu dharma between a master and a disciple, whose attention is drifting towards a woman in the nearby garden. As the discussion goes on, the woman is bitten by a snake and falls dead – an act that deeply affects the disciple. To demonstrate his yogic power, the master transfers the disciple's soul into the woman's body, who then rises and continues the philosophical discussion.

Translations
The play was rediscovered in the early 20th century when it was first translated into Telugu in 1924 by Veturi Prabhakara Sastri, who then got it published in the Devanagri script through Vavilla Press in 1925. In 1932, the play was translated into Italian, L'asceta transmutato in etèra, by the Indologist Ferdinando Belloni-Filippi. The first English translation of the play was published by the Dutch Indologist J. A. B. van Buitenen in the journal Mahfil (now Journal of South Asian Literature) in 1971 with the title The Hermit and the Harlot.

Performance history
In 1967, the play was directed in Hindi by Shanta Gandhi at the National School of Drama. It has often been adapted to be performed as Koodiyattam, a traditional performing art of Kerala. The play continues to be performed in many regional Indian languages. In 2011, Kavalam Narayana Panicker directed the play at the Ernakulam Town Hall in Kochi. Other recent productions were held in 2013, 2015, 2016, 2019, 2020.

References

Bibliography

Sanskrit plays
Indian plays
Ancient Indian literature
7th-century plays
Sanskrit texts
7th-century Indian books
Comedy plays
Satirical plays
Comedy-drama plays